Eupithecia serenata is a moth in the family Geometridae. It is found in Russia.

References

Moths described in 1896
serenata
Moths of Asia